The 2020 Wagner Seahawks football team represented Wagner College in the 2020–21 NCAA Division I FCS football season as a member of the Northeast Conference (NEC). They were led by first-year head coach Tom Masella and played their home games at Wagner College Stadium.

Previous season

The Seahawks finished the 2019 season 1–11, 1–6 in NEC play to finish in seventh place. Head coach Jason Houghtaling was fired at the end of the season after his fourth losing season in five years.

Schedule
Wagner had games scheduled against Monmouth, Fordham and Miami, but these games were canceled before the season due to the COVID-19 pandemic.

References

Wagner
Wagner Seahawks football seasons
Wagner Seahawks football
College football winless seasons